The Italian  Catholic Diocese of Adria-Rovigo, in the Triveneto, has existed under this name since 1986. It is a Latin suffragan to the Patriarchate of Venice.

Its territory comprises roughly the northeastern Italian Province of Rovigo (Rovigo itself is not an episcopal see), and a part of one town in the Province of Padua.

In 2015, in the diocese of Adria-Rovigo there was one priest for every 1,355 Catholics.

Special churches 
Its Cathedral episcopal see is the Cattedrale di SS. Pietro e Paolo dedicated to Saints Peter and Paul, in Adria, province of Rovigo.

It has a Co-Cathedral: Concattedrale di S. Stefano Papa e Martire Concattedrale dedicated to Martyr Pope Stephen I, in Rovigo, which never was a diocese.

Furthermores, there are several Minor Basilicas : 
 Basilica di S. Apollinare Basilica di S. Apollinare, in Rovigo
 Basilica di S. Bellino Basilica in San Bellino, Rovigo
 Basilica di S. Maria Assunta della Tomba in Adria
 Basilica del Pilastrello in Lendinara, Rovigo

Ecclesiastical history 
Tradition dates the preaching of the Gospel in Adria from the days of Saint Apollinaris, himself consecrated bishop by Saint Peter. The figure of this Bishop of Ravenna has a singular importance in the hagiographical legends of the northeast of Italy. Even if Emilia, Romagna and the territory around Venice were Christianized and had bishops (the two facts are concomitant) before Piedmont, for example, their conversion does not go back beyond the end of the second century.

The first known bishop of Adria is Gallonistus, who was present at a synod in Rome (649) under Pope Martin I (Mansi, XII). The Venerable Bede's Martyrology mentions a Saint Colianus, Bishop of Adria, but nothing is known about him.

Established in 640 AD as Diocese of Adria. Amongst the bishops of Adria is the Blessed Aldobrandinus of Este (1248-1352).

Gained territory on 1818.05.01 from the Metropolitan Archdiocese of Ravenna, and exchanged territory with the Metropolitan Archdiocese of Ferrara
Exchanged territory again on 1819.03.09 with Diocese of Padova

The diocese had in the early 20th century, for a population of 190,400: 80 parishes, 300 churches, chapels and oratories; 250 secular priests, 72 seminarians, 12 regular priests and 9 lay-brothers; 90 confraternities; 3 boys schools (97 pupils) and 6 girls schools (99 pupils).

Renamed on 1986.09.30 as Diocese of Adria–Rovigo.

Bishops 
(all Roman Rite)(incomplete : first millennium mostly unavailable)

Diocese of Adria
Erected: 7th Century
Latin Name: Adriensis
Metropolitan: Patriarchate of Venice

to 1500

Gallionistus (649)
...
Leo (or Leopertus) (861)
Theodinus (877)
...
Paulus (920)
Gemerius (attested in 953)
Astulf (ca. 972–992)
...
Benedictus (ca. 1050–1063) laid the foundation stone for the Cathedral at Rovigo.
...
Rolandus Zabarelli (ca. 1210–1233)
Guilelmus d'Este (1240–1257)
Jacobus (1270–ca. 1277)
Pellegrinus (1277–1280)
Otholinus, O.Camald. (1280–1284)
Bonifatius (ca. 1285–1286)
Bonajuncta (Bonaggiunta) (1288–1306)
Joannes, O.Humil. (1308–1317)
Aegidius (1317)
Salionus Buzzacarini (1318–1327)
Exuperantius Lambertuzzi (1327–1329)
Benvenuto Borghesini, O.P. (1329–1348)
Aldobrandino d'Este (19 Mar 1348 – 18 Jan 1353)  (transferred to Bishop of Modena)
Giovanni da Siena (bishop), O.F.M. Conv. (1 Nov 1352 – )
...
Antonio Contarini (Aug 1384 – 1386 Died)
Ugo Roberti (1 Sep 1386 – 7 May 1392 Appointed, Bishop of Padua)
...
Bartolomeo Roverella (15 Jul 1444 – 26 Sep 1445 Appointed, Archbishop of Ravenna)
...

Nicolò Maria d'Este (31 May 1487 – 5 Aug 1507 Died)

1500 to 1700

Beltrame Costabili (27 Aug 1507 – 1519 Died)
Ercole Rangone (15 Jun 1519 – 27 May 1524 Resigned)
Giambattista Bragadin (27 May 1524 – 23 May 1528 Died)
Giovanni Domenico de Cupis (31 Aug 1528 – 10 Dec 1553 Died)
Giulio Canani (26 Nov 1554 – 8 Feb 1591 Appointed, Bishop of Modena)
Laurentius Laureti, O. Carm. (13 Feb 1591 – 1598 Died)
Girolamo di Porzia (7 Aug 1598 – Aug 1612 Died)
Ludovico Sarego (17 Sep 1612 – 24 Sep 1622 Resigned)
Ubertinus Papafava (10 May 1623 – Oct 1631 Died)
Germanicus Mantica (21 Feb 1633 – Feb 1639 Died)
Giovanni Paolo Savio (19 Dec 1639 – Oct 1650 Died)
Bonifacio Agliardi (Alliardi), C.R. (2 Aug 1655 – 1 Feb 1666 Died)
Tommaso Retani (16 Mar 1667 – 1677 Resigned)
Carlo Labia, C.R. (13 Sep 1677 – 29 Nov 1701 Died)

1700 to 1900

Filippo della Torre (6 Feb 1702 – 25 Feb 1717 Died)
Antonio Vaira (12 Jul 1717 – 8 Oct 1732 Died)
Giovanni Soffietti, C.R.M. (19 Jan 1733 – 7 Sep 1747 Died)
Pietro Maria Suárez (20 Nov 1747 – 19 Jun 1750 Died)
Pellegrino Ferri (16 Nov 1750 – 30 Sep 1757 Died)
Giovanni Francesco Mora, C.O. (2 Oct 1758 – 15 Jan 1766 Died)
Arnaldo Speroni degli Alvarotti, O.S.B. (2 Jun 1766 – 2 Nov 1800 Died)
Federico Maria Molin (24 Aug 1807 – 16 Apr 1819 Died)
Carlo Pio Ravasi, O.S.B. (8 Jan 1821 Confirmed – 2 Oct 1833 Died)
Antonio-Maria Calcagno (19 Dec 1834 Confirmed – 8 Jan 1841 Died)
Bernardo Antonino Squarcina, O.P. (27 Jan 1842 – 22 Dec 1851 Died)
Giacomo Bignotti (27 Sep 1852 – 7 Mar 1857 Died)
Camillo Benzon (27 Sep 1858 – 10 Dec 1866 Died)
Pietro Colli (27 Mar 1867 – 30 Oct 1868 Died)
Emmanuele Kaubeck (27 Oct 1871 – 31 Aug 1877 Died)
Giovanni Maria Berengo (31 Dec 1877 – 12 May 1879 Appointed, Bishop of Mantova)
Giuseppe Apollonio (12 May 1879 – 25 Sep 1882 Appointed, Bishop of Treviso)
Antonio Polin (25 Sep 1882 – 18 May 1908 Died)

since 1900

Tommaso Pio Boggiani, O.P. (31 Oct 1908 – 9 Jan 1912) (Appointed Titular Archbishop of Edessa in Osrhoëne, then Cardinal in 1916. He was Archbishop of Genoa, 1919–1921)
Anselmo Rizzi (4 Jun 1913 – 19 Oct 1934 Died)
Guido Maria Mazzocco (12 Nov 1936 – 8 Nov 1968 Died)
Giovanni Mocellini (1 Jan 1969 – 12 Mar 1977 Resigned)
Giovanni Maria Sartori (12 Mar 1977 – 7 Dec 1987 Appointed, Archbishop of Trento)
Martino Gomiero (7 May 1988 – 11 Oct 2000 Retired)

Diocese of Adria-Rovigo
Name Changed: 30 September 1986
Latin Name: Adriensis-Rhodigiensis
Metropolitan: Patriarchate of Venice
Andrea Bruno Mazzocato (11 Oct 2000 – 3 Dec 2003 Appointed, Bishop of Treviso)
Lucio Soravito de Franceschi (29 May 2004 – 23 Dec 2015 Retired)
Pierantonio Pavanello (23 Dec 2015 – )

References

Sources 
Buonaiuti, Ernesto. "Adria." The Catholic Encyclopedia. Vol. 1. New York: Robert Appleton Company, 1907. Retrieved: 2016-10-16. 
Cappelletti, Giuseppe (1854), Le chiese d'Italia  Volume decimo (10) Venezia. Giuseppe Antonelli, pp. 9–102. 

 p. 768-770. (in Latin)
 (in Latin)

 (in Latin)
 (in Latin)

 Zattoni, "Il valore storico della Passio di S. Apollinare e la fondazione dell episcopato a Ravenna e in Romagna," in: Rivista storico-critica delle scienze teologiche, I, 10 and II, 3.

See also 
 Adria

Acknowledgment
 

Adria
Rovigo
Adria